Farsetia socotrana is a species of flowering plant in the family Brassicaceae. It is found only in Yemen. Its natural habitat is subtropical or tropical dry shrubland. It is threatened by habitat loss.

References

socotrana
Endemic flora of Socotra
Vulnerable flora of Asia
Taxonomy articles created by Polbot